Innisbrook Resort and Golf Club is a hotel and country club resort in the southeastern United States, located in Palm Harbor, Florida, northwest of Tampa. The complex consists of a 620-room hotel, four golf courses, spa, three restaurants, and conference facilities.

The Innisbrook Resort has been owned and operated by Salamander Hotels & Resorts since July 2007, having previously been owned by the Golf Trust investment group since 2004 under the Westin Hotels & Resorts brand.

Golf
There are four golf courses at Innisbrook, all designed by Larry Packard, the oldest of which is the Island Course, which was completed in 1970. The Copperhead Course, venue for the PGA Tour's Valspar Championship, came next in 1974, and originally had 27 holes before nine were used as the basis of the Highlands North Course. The final addition was the Highlands South Course.

Winners of the tournament have included major champions Jordan Spieth, Charl Schwartzel, Retief Goosen, Vijay Singh, and Jim Furyk.

Scorecard

In gaming
The Copperhead course was featured as part of the lineup of course offerings in the Links (series) of golf games for the PC. It was again showcased in PGA Tour 2K21 as an official course; the Valspar Championship was also one of the featured events in its career mode.

References

External links

Golf clubs and courses in Florida
Sports venues in Pinellas County, Florida
1970 establishments in Florida